Haunted Chocolatier is an upcoming confectionery store simulation game by ConcernedApe, the developer of Stardew Valley. It has no set release date.

Gameplay 

Haunted Chocolatier is a simulation game with action role-playing elements. The player's character runs a confectionery store. The player collects ingredients to make chocolate confections while also interacting with town locals and ghosts. The player can pursue romantic relationships with non-player characters and can customize the layout of their store.

In combat, the player can use weapons and shields to block and deflect attacks.

Development 

Eric Barone, under the name ConcernedApe, began to develop Haunted Chocolatier in 2020. Following his indie hit game Stardew Valley, Barone planned a similar solo development process in which he would make everything on his own. He announced the game with a gameplay trailer in October 2021 and launched a promotional website. Barone is simultaneously collaborating on another unannounced game.

Haunted Chocolatier and Stardew Valley share a similar pixel art style and are expected to share some connection. Despite Haunted Chocolatier darker subject matter, such as a haunted castle and ghosts, he wanted the game to be "uplifting and life-affirming" and does not consider the subject matter to be negative.

Haunted Chocolatier is initially planned for release on PC, though the developer is interested in other platforms as well. It has no set release date.

References

External links 

 

Indie video games
Single-player video games
Social simulation video games
Upcoming video games
Video games about food and drink
Windows games